This is an incomplete list of DIN standards.
 The "STATUS" column gives the latest known status of the standard.
 If a standard has been withdrawn and no replacement specification is listed, either the specification was withdrawn without replacement or a replacement specification could not be identified.
 DIN stands for "Deutsches Institut für Normung", meaning "German institute for standardisation". DIN standards that begin with "DIN V" ("", meaning "pre-issue") are the result of standardization work, but because of certain reservations on the content or because of the divergent compared to a standard installation procedure of DIN, they are not yet published standards.

DIN 1 to DIN 999

DIN 1 to DIN 99

DIN 100 to DIN 199

DIN 200 to DIN 299

DIN 300 to DIN 399

DIN 400 to DIN 499

DIN 500 to DIN 599

DIN 600 to DIN 699

DIN 700 to DIN 799

DIN 800 to DIN 899

DIN 900 to DIN 999

DIN 1000 to DIN 9999

DIN 1000 to DIN 1999

DIN 2000 to DIN 2999

DIN 3000 to DIN 3999

DIN 4000 to DIN 4999

DIN 5000 to DIN 5999

DIN 6000 to DIN 6999

DIN 7000 to DIN 7999

DIN 8000 to DIN 8999

DIN 9000 to DIN 9999

DIN 10000 to DIN 19999

DIN 10000 to DIN 10999

DIN 11000 to DIN 11999

DIN 12000 to DIN 12999

DIN 13000 to DIN 13999

DIN 14000 to DIN 14999

DIN 15000 to DIN 15999

DIN 16000 to DIN 16999

DIN 17000 to DIN 17999

DIN 18000 to DIN 18999

DIN 19000 to DIN 19999

DIN 20000 to DIN 29999

DIN 24000 to DIN 24999

DIN 28000 to DIN 28999

DIN 30000 to DIN 39999

DIN 31000 to DIN 31999

DIN 40000 to DIN 49999

DIN 51097 to DIN 59999

DIN ISO 53438

DIN 60000 to DIN 69999

DIN 70000 to DIN 79999

See also
 List of EN standards
 List of IEC standards
 List of ISO standards

References

External links
DIN Website, in English
DIN Fasteners in Details

DIN